The 1956–57 NBA season was the Warriors' 11th season in the NBA.

Offseason

Roster

Regular season

Season standings

x – clinched playoff spot

Record vs. opponents

Game log

Playoffs

|- align="center" bgcolor="#ffcccc"
| 1
| March 16
| Syracuse
| L 96–103
| Neil Johnston (25)
| Neil Johnston (26)
| George Dempsey (8)
| Philadelphia Civic Center
| 0–1
|- align="center" bgcolor="#ffcccc"
| 2
| March 18
| @ Syracuse
| L 80–91
| Joe Graboski (16)
| Walt Davis (10)
| Neil Johnston (5)
| Onondaga War Memorial
| 0–2
|-

Awards and records
 Paul Arizin, NBA All-Star Game
 Neil Johnston, NBA All-Star Game
 Paul Arizin, NBA scoring champion
 Paul Arizin, All-NBA First Team
 Neil Johnston, All-NBA Second Team

References

Golden State Warriors seasons
Philadelphia